Lathrop Glacier was in the U.S. state of Oregon. The glacier was situated in the Cascade Range at an elevation generally above  on the steep northeast slope of Mount Thielsen, an extinct shield volcano. Lathrop Glacier consisted of two small bodies of ice, first discovered in 1966, and was the southernmost glacier in the state of Oregon.

In August 2020, the Oregon Glaciers Institute reported that the glacier had disappeared.

See also
 List of glaciers in the United States

References

External links
 

Glaciers of Oregon
Glaciers of Douglas County, Oregon